Lebrunia is a genus of sea anemones in the family Aliciidae.

Species 
The following species are recognized:

 Lebrunia coralligens (Wilson, 1890)
 Lebrunia neglecta Duchassaing & Michelotti, 1860

References 

Aliciidae
Hexacorallia genera